is Aiko Kayō's seventh single. It was released on May 25, 2005, by Avex Trax. Kokoro no Wakusei ~Little Planets~ was used as the first ending theme for the anime The Law of Ueki. The b-side track is a cover of one of Kylie Minogue's older singles.

Track listing
 Kokoro no Wakusei ~Little Planets~
 Step Back in Time
 Kokoro no Wakusei ~Little Planets~ (Instrumental)
 Step Back in Time (Instrumental)

Chart

References

External links
 Kokoro no Wakusei ~Little planets~ at AVEX Records.

2005 singles
Aiko Kayō songs
2005 songs